Antonio Panfili (born 27 November 1993) is an Italian figure skater, since 2014 he became an in-line figure skater. He is also both an ice and inline coach. He placed 22nd at the 2013 World Junior Championships, 1st at the WIFSA World Open 2016 and 3rd at the FIRS World Championships 2016.
He is part of the Pattinaggio Creativo group of skater artist both ice and inline and he performs in many events and in a TV show, Tu Si Que Vales.

Programs

Competitive highlights Ice Figure Skating

Competitive highlights Inline Figure Skating

References

External links 
 
 Antonio Panfili at sport-folio.net

1993 births
Italian male single skaters
Living people
Sportspeople from Venice